The FAI Cup 1923–24 was the third edition of Ireland's premier cup competition, The Football Association of Ireland Challenge Cup or FAI Cup. The tournament began on 5 January 1924 and concluded on 17 March with the final held at Dalymount Park, Dublin. An official attendance of 18,000 people watched Dinny Hannon secure Athlone Town's sole FAI Cup title by defeating Cork side Fordsons.

First round

Second round

Semi-finals

Replay

Final

Notes
A.  From 1923-1936, the FAI Cup was known as the Free State Cup.

B.  Attendances were calculated using gate receipts which limited their accuracy as a large proportion of people, particularly children, attended football matches in Ireland throughout the 20th century for free by a number of means.

References
General

External links
FAI Website

1923-24
1923–24 in Irish association football
FAI Cup